Georgia Street is an east–west street in the cities of Vancouver and Burnaby, British Columbia, Canada. Its section in Downtown Vancouver, designated West Georgia Street, serves as one of the primary streets for the financial and central business districts, and is the major transportation corridor connecting downtown Vancouver with the North Shore (and eventually Whistler) by way of the Lions Gate Bridge. The remainder of the street, known as East Georgia Street between Main Street and Boundary Road and simply Georgia Street within Burnaby, is more residential in character, and is discontinuous at several points.

West of Seymour Street, the thoroughfare is part of Highway 99. The entire section west of Main Street was previously designated part of Highway 1A, and markers for the '1A' designation can still be seen at certain points.

Route
Starting from its western terminus at Chilco Street by the edge of Stanley Park, Georgia Street runs southeast, separating the West End from the Coal Harbour neighbourhood. It then runs through the Financial District; landmarks and major skyscrapers along the way include Living Shangri-La, Trump International Hotel and Tower, Royal Centre, 666 Burrard tower, Hotel Vancouver and upscale shops, the HSBC Canada Building, the Vancouver Art Gallery, Georgia Hotel, Four Seasons Hotel, Pacific Centre, the Granville Entertainment District, Scotia Tower, and the Canada Post headquarters. The eastern portion of West Georgia features the Theatre District (including Queen Elizabeth Theatre and the Centre in Vancouver for the Performing Arts), Library Square (the central branch of the Vancouver Public Library), Rogers Arena, and BC Place. West Georgia's centre lane between Pender Street and Stanley Park is used as a counterflow lane.

East of Cambie Street, Georgia Street becomes a one-way street for eastbound traffic, and connects to the Georgia Viaduct for eastbound travellers only, which subsequently flows into Prior Street after crossing Main Street; westbound traffic is handled by Dunsmuir Street and the Dunsmuir Viaduct, located one block to the north.

East Georgia Street begins at an intersection with Main Street to the north of the Georgia and Dunsmuir Viaducts in Vancouver's Chinatown, then runs eastwards through Strathcona, Grandview–Woodland and Hastings–Sunrise to Boundary Road. East of the municipal boundary, Georgia Street continues eastwards through Burnaby until its terminus at Grove Avenue in the Lochdale neighbourhood. This portion of Georgia Street is interrupted at several locations, such as Templeton Secondary School, Highway 1 and Kensington Park.

History
Georgia Street was named in 1886 after the Strait of Georgia and ran between Chilco and Beatty Streets. After the first Georgia Viaduct opened in 1915, the street's eastern end was connected to Harris Street, and Harris Street was subsequently renamed East Georgia Street.

The second Georgia Viaduct, opened in 1972, connects to Prior Street at its eastern end instead. As a result, East Georgia Street has been disconnected from West Georgia ever since.

On June 15, 2011, Georgia Street became the focal point of the 2011 Vancouver Stanley Cup riot.

Major intersections
West Georgia Street; from north to south.

References

Streets in Vancouver
Shopping districts and streets in Canada
Former segments of the Trans-Canada Highway